Burrton is a city in Harvey County, Kansas, United States.  It is named after Isaac T. Burr, former vice-president of the Atchison, Topeka and Santa Fe Railway.  As of the 2020 census, the population of the city was 861.

History

19th century

For millennia, the land now known as Kansas was inhabited by Native Americans.  In 1803, most of modern Kansas was secured by the United States as part of the Louisiana Purchase.  In 1854, the Kansas Territory was organized, then in 1861 Kansas became the 34th U.S. state.  In 1872, Harvey County was founded.

Burrton was laid out in 1873. It was named from Burrton Township, which was named for I.T. Burr, a railroad official. The first post office in Burrton was established in June 1873. Burrton was incorporated as a city in 1878.

Burrton's location at the junction of two railroads made it an important regional shipping point.

Geography
Burrton is located at coordinates 38.0239001, -97.6697675 in the state of Kansas.

Demographics

2010 census
As of the census of 2010, there were 901 people, 347 households, and 237 families residing in the city. The racial makeup of the city was 93.9% White, 0.4% African American, 1.1% Native American, 0.1% Asian, 2.7% from other races, and 1.8% from two or more races. Hispanic or Latino of any race were 6.2% of the population.

There were 347 households, of which 36.0% had children under the age of 18 living with them, 54.5% were married couples living together, 9.8% had a female householder with no husband present, 4.0% had a male householder with no wife present, and 31.7% were non-families. 26.2% of all households were made up of individuals, and 9.2% had someone living alone who was 65 years of age or older. The average household size was 2.60 and the average family size was 3.14.

The median age in the city was 36.2 years. 30.2% of residents were under the age of 18; 6.7% were between the ages of 18 and 24; 23.6% were from 25 to 44; 26.1% were from 45 to 64; and 13.4% were 65 years of age or older. The gender makeup of the city was 47.3% male and 52.7% female.

2000 census
As of the census of 2000, there were 932 people, 361 households, and 251 families residing in the city. The racial makeup of the city was 93.78% White, 0.97% African American, 0.43% Native American, 2.25% from other races, and 2.58% from two or more races. Hispanic or Latino of any race were 5.15% of the population.

There were 361 households, out of which 33.0% had children under the age of 18 living with them, 57.1% were married couples living together, 8.9% had a female householder with no husband present, and 30.2% were non-families. 26.0% of all households were made up of individuals, and 10.0% had someone living alone who was 65 years of age or older. The average household size was 2.58 and the average family size was 3.08.

In the city, the population was spread out, with 28.2% under the age of 18, 10.4% from 18 to 24, 28.8% from 25 to 44, 19.5% from 45 to 64, and 13.1% who were 65 years of age or older. The median age was 34 years. For every 100 females, there were 96.2 males. For every 100 females age 18 and over, there were 93.9 males.

As of 2000 the median income for a household in the city was $33,646, and the median income for a family was $37,174. Males had a median income of $29,643 versus $21,477 for females. The per capita income for the city was $14,835. About 9.9% of families and 11.6% of the population were below the poverty line, including 18.4% of those under age 18 and 7.9% of those age 65 or over.

Education
The community is served by Burrton USD 369 public school district.

The Burrton Chargers won the following Kansas State High School championships:
 1977 Boys Cross Country - Class 1A
 1978 Boys Cross Country - Class 1A
 1979 Boys Cross Country - Class 1A
 1979 Boys Track & Field - Class 1A
 1986 Girls Cross Country - Class 1A
 1986 Girls Track & Field - Class 1A
 1987 Girls Track & Field - Class 1A
 1988 Girls Cross Country - Class 1A
 1988 Girls Track & Field - Class 1A
 1989 Girls Track & Field - Class 1A
 1990 Girls Track & Field - Class 1A
 1992 Girls Basketball - Class 1A
 1997 Boys Track & Field - Class 1A 
 2003 Boys Basketball - Class 1A

Notable people

 Andy Dirks, professional baseball player for the Detroit Tigers.
 Milburn Stone, portrayed fictional Galen "Doc" Adams, M.D., of Dodge City on the long-running CBS western television series, Gunsmoke.

See also
 La Junta Subdivision, branch of the BNSF Railway
 Arkansas Valley Interurban Railway

References

Further reading

External links

City
 
 Burrton - Directory of Public Officials
Historical
 Harvey County Genealogical Society
 Harvey County Roots
 Historic Images of Burrton, Special Photo Collections at Wichita State University Library
Maps
 Burrton City Map, KDOT
 Harvey County Maps: Current, Historic, KDOT

Cities in Kansas
Cities in Harvey County, Kansas
Wichita, KS Metropolitan Statistical Area